Dragon Peak is a 12,955-foot-elevation (3,949 meter) mountain summit located on the crest of the Sierra Nevada mountain range in northern California. It is situated on the common border of Fresno County with Inyo County, as well as the boundary shared by John Muir Wilderness and Kings Canyon National Park. Dragon Peak ranks as the 161st-highest summit in California. This mountain is habitat for the endangered Sierra Nevada bighorn sheep, which restricts climbing from July through December, so most ascents are made in the spring. The first ascent of the summit was made in 1920 by either Norman Clyde, or Fred Parker and J. E. Rother. The John Muir Trail traverses two miles west of this peak, providing an approach option. The mountain is so named because of the shape of its outline as seen from Rae Lakes.

Climate
According to the Köppen climate classification system, Dragon Peak has an alpine climate. Most weather fronts originate in the Pacific Ocean, and travel east toward the Sierra Nevada mountains. As fronts approach, they are forced upward by the peaks (orographic lift), causing them to drop their moisture in the form of rain or snowfall onto the range. Precipitation runoff from this mountain drains east to the Owens Valley via Independence Creek, and west into the Kings River watershed.

See also
 
 List of mountain peaks of California

References

External links
 Weather forecast: Dragon Peak
 Dragon Peak (photo): Flickr

Mountains of Fresno County, California
Mountains of Kings Canyon National Park
Inyo National Forest
Mountains of Inyo County, California
Mountains of the John Muir Wilderness
North American 3000 m summits
Mountains of Northern California
Sierra Nevada (United States)